Prehistoric Egypt and Predynastic Egypt span the period from the earliest human settlement to the beginning of the Early Dynastic Period around 3100 BC, starting with the first Pharaoh, Narmer for some Egyptologists, Hor-Aha for others, with the name Menes also possibly used for one of these kings.

At the end of prehistory, "Predynastic Egypt" is traditionally defined as the period from the final part of the Neolithic period beginning c. 6000 BC to the end of the Naqada III period c. 3000 BC. The dates of the Predynastic period were first defined before widespread archaeological excavation of Egypt took place, and recent finds indicating very gradual Predynastic development have led to controversy over when exactly the Predynastic period ended. Thus, various terms such as "Protodynastic period", "Zero Dynasty" or "Dynasty 0" are used to name the part of the period which might be characterized as Predynastic by some and Early Dynastic by others.

The Predynastic period is generally divided into cultural eras, each named after the place where a certain type of Egyptian settlement was first discovered. However, the same gradual development that characterizes the Protodynastic period is present throughout the entire Predynastic period, and individual "cultures" must not be interpreted as separate entities but as largely subjective divisions used to facilitate study of the entire period.

The vast majority of Predynastic archaeological finds have been in Upper Egypt, because the silt of the Nile River was more heavily deposited at the Delta region, completely burying most Delta sites long before modern times.

Paleolithic
Excavation of the Nile has exposed early stone tools from the last million or so years. The earliest of these lithic industries were located within a 30-metre (100 ft) terrace, and were primitive Acheulean, Abbevillian (Chellean) ( 600,000 years ago), and an Egyptian form of the Clactonian ( 400,000 years ago). Within the 15-metre (50 ft) terrace was developed Acheulean. Originally reported as early Mousterian ( 160,000 years ago) but since changed to Levalloisean, other implements were located in the 10-metre (30 ft) terrace. The 4.5- and 3-metre (15–10 ft) terraces saw a more developed version of the Levalloisean, also initially reported as an Egyptian version of Mousterian. An Egyptian version of the Aterian technology was also located.

Wadi Halfa

Some of the oldest known structures were discovered in Egypt by archaeologist Waldemar Chmielewski along the southern border near Wadi Halfa, Sudan in Arkin 8 site. Chmielewski dated the structures to 100,000 BC. The remains of the structures are oval depressions about 30 cm deep and 2 × 1 meters across. Many are lined with flat sandstone slabs which served as tent rings supporting a dome-like shelter of skins or brush. This type of dwelling provided a place to live, but if necessary, could be taken down easily and moved. They were mobile structures—easily disassembled, moved, and reassembled—providing hunter-gatherers with semi-permanent habitation.

Aterian industry

Aterian tool-making reached Egypt c. 40,000 BC.

Khormusan industry
The Khormusan industry in Egypt began between 42,000 and 32,000 BP. Khormusans developed tools not only from stone but also from animal bones and hematite. They also developed small arrow heads resembling those of Native Americans, but no bows have been found. The end of the Khormusan industry came around 16,000 B.C. with the appearance of other cultures in the region, including the Gemaian.

Late Paleolithic
The Late Paleolithic in Egypt started around 30,000 BC. The Nazlet Khater skeleton was found in 1980 and given an age of 33,000 years in 1982, based on nine samples ranging between 35,100 and 30,360 years old. This specimen is the only complete modern human skeleton from the earliest Late Stone Age in Africa.

Mesolithic

Halfan and Kubbaniyan culture

The Halfan and Kubbaniyan, two closely related industries, flourished along the Upper Nile Valley. Halfan sites are found in the far north of Sudan, whereas Kubbaniyan sites are found in Upper Egypt. For the Halfan, only four radiocarbon dates have been produced. Schild and Wendorf (2014) discard the earliest and latest as erratic and conclude that the Halfan existed c. 22.5-22.0 ka cal BP. People survived on a diet of large herd animals and the Khormusan tradition of fishing. Greater concentrations of artifacts indicate that they were not bound to seasonal wandering, but settled for longer periods. The Halfan culture was derived in turn from the Khormusan, which depended on specialized hunting, fishing, and collecting techniques for survival. The primary material remains of this culture are stone tools, flakes, and a multitude of rock paintings.

Sebilian culture

In Egypt, analyses of pollen found at archaeological sites indicate that the people of the Sebilian culture (also known as the Esna culture) were gathering wheat and barley.
The Sebilian culture began around 13,000 B.C and vanished around 10,000 B.C Domesticated seeds were not found. It has been hypothesized that the sedentary lifestyle used by farmers led to increased warfare, which was detrimental to farming and brought this period to an end.

Qadan culture

The Qadan culture (13,000–9,000 BC) was a Mesolithic industry that, archaeological evidence suggests, originated in Upper Egypt (present-day south Egypt) approximately 15,000 years ago. The Qadan subsistence mode is estimated to have persisted for approximately 4,000 years. It was characterized by hunting, as well as a unique approach to food gathering that incorporated the preparation and consumption of wild grasses and grains. Systematic efforts were made by the Qadan people to water, care for, and harvest local plant life, but grains were not planted in ordered rows.

Around twenty archaeological sites in Upper Nubia give evidence for the existence of the Qadan culture's grain-grinding culture. Its makers also practiced wild grain harvesting along the Nile during the beginning of the Sahaba Daru Nile phase, when desiccation in the Sahara caused residents of the Libyan oases to retreat into the Nile valley. Among the Qadan culture sites is the Jebel Sahaba cemetery, which has been dated to the Mesolithic.

Qadan peoples were the first to develop sickles and they also developed grinding stones independently to aid in the collecting and processing of these plant foods prior to consumption. However, there are no indications of the use of these tools after around 10,000 BC, when hunter-gatherers replaced them.

Harifian culture

The Harifians (8,800 – 8,000 BC) are viewed as migrating out of the Fayyum and the eastern deserts of Egypt (including Sinai) during the late Mesolithic to merge with the Pre-Pottery Neolithic B (PPNB) culture, whose tool assemblage resembles that of the Harifian. This assimilation led to the Circum-Arabian Nomadic Pastoral Complex, a group of cultures that invented nomadic pastoralism, and may have been the original culture which spread Proto-Semitic languages throughout Mesopotamia.

Neolithic

Lower Egypt

Faiyum A culture

Continued expansion of the desert forced the early ancestors of the Egyptians to settle around the Nile more permanently and adopt a more sedentary lifestyle during the Neolithic.

The period from 9000 to 6000 BC has left very little in the way of archaeological evidence. Around 6000 BC, Neolithic settlements appear all over Egypt. Studies based on morphological, genetic, and archaeological data have attributed these settlements to migrants from the Fertile Crescent in the Near East returning during the Egyptian and North African Neolithic, bringing agriculture to the region. Jared Diamond, in a non-scholarly work, proposes other regions in Africa independently developed agriculture at about the same time: the Ethiopian highlands, the Sahel, and West Africa.

Some morphological and post-cranial data has linked the earliest farming populations at Fayum, Merimde, and El-Badari, to Near Eastern populations. However, the archaeological data also suggests that Near Eastern domesticates were incorporated into a pre-existing foraging strategy and only slowly developed into a full-blown lifestyle, contrary to what would be expected from settler colonists from the Near East. Finally, the names for the Near Eastern domesticates imported into Egypt were not Sumerian or Proto-Semitic loan words, which further diminishes the likelihood of a mass migrant colonization of lower Egypt during the transition to agriculture.

Weaving is evidenced for the first time during the Faiyum A Period. People of this period, unlike later Egyptians, buried their dead very close to, and sometimes inside, their settlements.

Although archaeological sites reveal very little about this time, an examination of the many Egyptian words for "city" provides a hypothetical list of causes of Egyptian sedentarism. In Upper Egypt, terminology indicates trade, protection of livestock, high ground for flood refuge, and sacred sites for deities.

Merimde culture

From about 5000 to 4200 BC the Merimde culture, so far only known from Merimde Beni Salama, a large settlement site at the edge of the Western Delta, flourished in Lower Egypt. The culture has strong connections to the Faiyum A culture as well as the Levant. People lived in small huts, produced a simple undecorated pottery and had stone tools. Cattle, sheep, goats and pigs were held. Wheat, sorghum and barley were planted. The Merimde people buried their dead within the settlement and produced clay figurines. The first life-sized Egyptian head made of clay comes from Merimde.

El Omari culture
The El Omari culture is known from a small settlement near modern Cairo. People seem to have lived in huts, but only postholes and pits survive. The pottery is undecorated. Stone tools include small flakes, axes and sickles. Metal was not yet known. Their sites were occupied from 4000 BC to the Archaic Period (3,100 BC).

Maadi culture

The Maadi culture (also called Buto Maadi culture) is the most important Lower Egyptian prehistoric culture dated about 4000 - 3500 BC, and contemporary with Naqada I and II phases in Upper Egypt. The culture is best known from the site Maadi near Cairo, as well as the site of Buto, but is also attested in many other places in the Delta to the Faiyum region. This culture was marked by development in architecture and technology. It also followed its predecessor cultures when it comes to undecorated ceramics.

Copper was known, and some copper adzes have been found. The pottery is hand-made; it is simple and undecorated. Presence of black-topped red pots indicate contact with the Naqada sites in the south. Many imported vessels from Palestine have also been found. Black basalt stone vessels were also used.

People lived in small huts, partly dug into the ground. The dead were buried in cemeteries, but with few burial goods. The Maadi culture was replaced by the Naqada III culture; whether this happened by conquest or infiltration is still an open question.

The developments in Lower Egypt in the times previous to the unification of the country have been the subject of considerable disputes over the years. The recent excavations at Tell el-Farkha (:de:Tell el-Farcha), Sais, and Tell el-Iswid have clarified this picture to some extent. As a result, the Chalcolithic Lower Egyptian culture is now emerging as an important subject of study.

Gallery

Upper Egypt

Nabta Playa

Nabta Playa was once a large internally drained basin in the Nubian Desert, located approximately 800 kilometers south of modern-day Cairo or about 100 kilometers west of Abu Simbel in southern Egypt, 22.51° north, 30.73° east. Today the region is characterized by numerous archaeological sites. The Nabta Playa archaeological site, one of the earliest of the Egyptian Neolithic Period, is dated to circa 7500 BC. Also, excavations from Nabta Playa, located about 100 km west of Abu Simbel for example, suggest that the Neolithic inhabitants of the region were migrants from Sub-Saharan Africa.

Tasian culture

The Tasian culture was the next in Upper Egypt. This culture group is named for the burials found at Der Tasa, on the east bank of the Nile between Asyut and Akhmim. The Tasian culture group is notable for producing the earliest blacktop-ware, a type of red and brown pottery that is colored black on the top portion and interior. This pottery is vital to the dating of Predynastic Egypt. Because all dates for the Predynastic period are tenuous at best, WMF Petrie developed a system called sequence dating by which the relative date, if not the absolute date, of any given Predynastic site can be ascertained by examining its pottery.

As the Predynastic period progressed, the handles on pottery evolved from functional to ornamental. The degree to which any given archaeological site has functional or ornamental pottery can also be used to determine the relative date of the site. Since there is little difference between Tasian ceramics and Badarian pottery, the Tasian Culture overlaps the Badarian range significantly. From the Tasian period onward, it appears that Upper Egypt was influenced strongly by the culture of Lower Egypt. Archaeological evidence has suggested that the Tasian and Badarian Nile Valley sites were a peripheral network of earlier African cultures that featured the movement of Badarian, Saharan, Nubian and Nilotic populations. Bruce Williams, Egyptologist, has argued that the Tasian culture was significantly related to the Sudanese-Saharan traditions from the Neolithic era which extended from regions north of Khartoum to locations near Dongola in Sudan.

Badarian culture

The Badarian culture, from about 4400 to 4000 BC, is named for the Badari site near Der Tasa. It followed the Tasian culture, but was so similar that many consider them one continuous period. The Badarian Culture continued to produce the kind of pottery called blacktop-ware (albeit much improved in quality) and was assigned Sequence Dating numbers 21–29. The primary difference that prevents scholars from merging the two periods is that Badarian sites use copper in addition to stone and are thus Chalcolithic settlements, while the Neolithic Tasian sites are still considered Stone Age.

Badarian flint tools continued to develop into sharper and more shapely blades, and the first faience was developed. Distinctly Badarian sites have been located from Nekhen to a little north of Abydos. It appears that the Fayum A culture and the Badarian and Tasian Periods overlapped significantly; however, the Fayum A culture was considerably less agricultural and was still Neolithic in nature. Several biological anthropological studies have shown strong biological affinities between the Badarians and other African populations.

In 2005, Keita examined Badarian crania from predynastic upper Egypt in comparison to various European and tropical African crania. He found that the predynastic Badarian series clustered much closer with the tropical African series. Although, no Asian or other North African samples were included in the study as the comparative series were selected based on "Brace et al.’s (1993) comments on the affinities of an upper Egyptian/Nubian epipalaeolithic series". Keita further noted that additional analysis and material from Sudan, late dynastic northern Egypt (Gizeh), Somalia, Asia and the Pacific Islands "show the Badarian series to be most similar to a series from the northeast quandrant of Africa and then to other Africans".

Dental trait analysis of Badarian fossils conducted in a thesis study found that they were closely related to other Afroasiatic-speaking populations inhabiting Northeast Africa and the Maghreb. Among the ancient populations, the Badarians were nearest to other ancient Egyptians (Naqada, Hierakonpolis, Abydos and Kharga in Upper Egypt; Hawara in Lower Egypt), and C-Group and Pharaonic era skeletons excavated in Lower Nubia, followed by the A-Group culture bearers of Lower Nubia, the Kerma and Kush populations in Upper Nubia, the Meroitic, X-Group and Christian period inhabitants of Lower Nubia, and the Kellis population in the Dakhla Oasis. Among the recent groups, the Badari markers were morphologically closest to the Shawia and Kabyle Berber populations of Algeria as well as Bedouin groups in Morocco, Libya and Tunisia, followed by other Afroasiatic-speaking populations in the Horn of Africa. The Late Roman era Badarian skeletons from Kellis were also phenotypically distinct from those belonging to other populations in Sub-Saharan Africa.

Naqada culture

The Naqada culture is an archaeological culture of Chalcolithic Predynastic Egypt (c. 4000–3000 BC), named for the town of Naqada, Qena Governorate. It is divided in three sub-periods: Naqada I, II and III. A number of biological anthropological studies have found Naqada skeletal remains to have clear, African affinities. 

In 1996, Lovell and Prowse also reported the presence of individuals buried at Naqada in what they interpreted to be elite, high status tombs, showing them to be an endogamous ruling or elite segment of the local population at Naqada, which is more closely related to populations in northern Nubia than to neighbouring populations in southern Egypt. Specifically, they stated the Naqda samples were "more similar to the Lower Nubian protodynastic sample than they are to the geographically more proximate Egyptian samples" in Qena and Badari. Although, they found the skeletal samples from the Naqada cemeteries to be significantly different to protodynastic populations in northern Nubia and predynastic Egyptian samples from Badari and Qena, which were also significantly different to northern Nubian populations. Overall, both the elite and nonelite individuals in the Naqada cemeteries were more similar to each other than they were to the samples in northern Nubia or to samples from Badari and Qena in southern Egypt. 

In 2023, Christopher Ehret reported that the physical anthropological findings from the “major burial sites of those founding locales of ancient Egypt in the fourth millennium BCE, notably El-Badari as well as Naqada, show no demographic indebtedness to the Levant”. Ehret specified that these studies revealed cranial and dental affinities with "closest parallels" to other longtime populations in the surrounding areas of northeastern Africa “such as Nubia and the northern Horn of Africa”. He further commented that the Naqada and Badarian populations did not migrate “from somewhere else but were descendants of the long-term inhabitants of these portions of Africa going back many millennia”.

Amratian culture (Naqada I)

The Amratian culture lasted from about 4000 to 3500 BC. It is named after the site of El-Amra, about 120 km south of Badari. El-Amra is the first site where this culture group was found unmingled with the later Gerzean culture group, but this period is better attested at the Naqada site, so it also is referred to as the Naqada I culture. Black-topped ware continues to appear, but white cross-line ware, a type of pottery which has been decorated with close parallel white lines being crossed by another set of close parallel white lines, is also found at this time. The Amratian period falls between S.D. 30 and 39 in Petrie's Sequence Dating system.

Newly excavated objects attest to increased trade between Upper and Lower Egypt at this time. A stone vase from the north was found at el-Amra, and copper, which is not mined in Egypt, was imported from the Sinai, or possibly Nubia. Obsidian and a small amount of gold were both definitely imported from Nubia. Trade with the oases also was likely.

New innovations appeared in Amratian settlements as precursors to later cultural periods. For example, the mud-brick buildings for which the Gerzean period is known were first seen in Amratian times, but only in small numbers. Additionally, oval and theriomorphic cosmetic palettes appear in this period, but the workmanship is very rudimentary and the relief artwork for which they were later known is not yet present.

Gerzean culture (Naqada II)

The Gerzean culture, from about 3500 to 3200 BC, is named after the site of Gerzeh. It was the next stage in Egyptian cultural development, and it was during this time that the foundation of Dynastic Egypt was laid. Gerzean culture is largely an unbroken development out of Amratian Culture, starting in the delta and moving south through upper Egypt, but failing to dislodge Amratian culture in Nubia. Gerzean pottery is assigned values from S.D. 40 through 62, and is distinctly different from Amratian white cross-lined wares or black-topped ware. Gerzean pottery was painted mostly in dark red with pictures of animals, people, and ships, as well as geometric symbols that appear derived from animals. Also, "wavy" handles, rare before this period (though occasionally found as early as S.D. 35) became more common and more elaborate until they were almost completely ornamental.

Gerzean culture coincided with a significant decline in rainfall, and farming along the Nile now produced the vast majority of food, though contemporary paintings indicate that hunting was not entirely forgone. With increased food supplies, Egyptians adopted a much more sedentary lifestyle and cities grew as large as 5,000.

It was in this time that Egyptian city dwellers stopped building with reeds and began mass-producing mud bricks, first found in the Amratian Period, to build their cities.

Egyptian stone tools, while still in use, moved from bifacial construction to ripple-flaked construction. Copper was used for all kinds of tools, and the first copper weaponry appears here. Silver, gold, lapis, and faience were used ornamentally, and the grinding palettes used for eye-paint since the Badarian period began to be adorned with relief carvings.

The first tombs in classic Egyptian style were also built, modeled after ordinary houses and sometimes composed of multiple rooms. Although further excavations in the Delta are needed, this style is generally believed to originate there and not in Upper Egypt.

Although the Gerzean Culture is now clearly identified as being the continuation of the Amratian period, significant Mesopotamian influence worked its way into Egypt during the Gerzean, interpreted in previous years as evidence of a Mesopotamian ruling class, the so-called Dynastic Race, coming to power over Upper Egypt. This idea no longer attracts academic support.

Distinctly foreign objects and art forms entered Egypt during this period, indicating contacts with several parts of Asia. Objects such as the Gebel el-Arak knife handle, which has patently Mesopotamian relief carvings on it, have been found in Egypt, and the silver which appears in this period can only have been obtained from Asia Minor.

In addition, Egyptian objects are created which clearly mimic Mesopotamian forms, although not slavishly. Cylinder seals appear in Egypt, as well as recessed paneling architecture, the Egyptian reliefs on cosmetic palettes are clearly made in the same style as the contemporary Mesopotamian Uruk culture, and the ceremonial mace heads which turn up from the late Gerzean and early Semainean are crafted in the Mesopotamian "pear-shaped" style, instead of the Egyptian native style.

The route of this trade is difficult to determine, but contact with Canaan does not predate the early dynastic, so it is usually assumed to have been conducted over water. During the time when the Dynastic Race Theory was still popular, it was theorized that Uruk sailors circumnavigated Arabia, but a Mediterranean route, probably by middlemen through Byblos, is more likely, as evidenced by the presence of Byblian objects in Egypt.

The fact that so many Gerzean sites are at the mouths of wadis that lead to the Red Sea may indicate some amount of trade via the Red Sea (though Byblian trade potentially could have crossed the Sinai and then taken the Red Sea). Also, it is considered unlikely that something so complicated as recessed panel architecture could have worked its way into Egypt by proxy, and at least a small contingent of migrants is often suspected.

Despite this evidence of foreign influence, Egyptologists generally agree that the Gerzean Culture is still predominantly indigenous to Egypt.

Protodynastic Period (Naqada III)

The Naqada III period, from about 3200 to 3000 BC, is generally taken to be identical with the Protodynastic period, during which Egypt was unified.

Naqada III is notable for being the first era with hieroglyphs (though this is disputed by some), the first regular use of serekhs, the first irrigation, and the first appearance of royal cemeteries.

The relatively affluent Maadi suburb of Cairo is built over the original Naqada stronghold.

Bioarchaeologist Nancy Lovell, had stated  that there is a sufficient body of morphological evidence to indicate that ancient southern Egyptians had physical characteristics "within the range of variation" of both ancient and modern indigenous peoples in the Sahara and tropical Africa. She summarised that "In general, the inhabitants of Upper Egypt and Nubia had the greatest biological affinity to people of the Sahara and more 
southerly areas" but exhibited local variation in an African context.

Timeline

 Late Paleolithic, from 40th millennium BC
 Aterian tool-making
 Semi-permanent dwellings in Wadi Halfa
 Tools made from animal bones, hematite, and other stones
 Neolithic, from 11th millennium BC
 c. 10,500 BC: Wild grain harvesting along the Nile, grain-grinding culture creates world's earliest stone sickle blades roughly at end of Pleistocene
 c. 8000 BC: Migration of peoples to the Nile, developing a more centralized society and settled agricultural economy
 c. 7500 BC: Importing animals from Asia to Sahara
 c. 7000 BC: Agriculture—animal and cereal—in East Sahara
 c. 7000 BC: in Nabta Playa deep year-round water wells dug, and large organized settlements designed in planned arrangements
 c. 6000 BC: Rudimentary ships (rowed, single-sailed) depicted in Egyptian rock art
 c. 5500 BC: Stone-roofed subterranean chambers and other subterranean complexes in Nabta Playa containing buried sacrificed cattle
 c. 5000 BC: Alleged archaeoastronomical stone megalith in Nabta Playa.
 c. 5000 BC: Badarian: furniture, tableware, models of rectangular houses, pots, dishes, cups, bowls, vases, figurines, combs
 c. 4400 BC: finely-woven linen fragment
 From 4th millennium BC, inventing has become prevalent
 c. 4000 BC: early Naqadan trade
 4th millennium BC: Gerzean tomb-building, including underground rooms and burial of furniture and amulets
 4th millennium BC: Cedar imported from Lebanon
 c. 3900 BC: An aridification event in the Sahara leads to human migration to the Nile Valley
 c. 3500 BC: Lapis lazuli imported from Badakshan and / or Mesopotamia
 c. 3500 BC: Senet, world's oldest (confirmed) board game
 c. 3500 BC: Faience, world's earliest-known glazed ceramic beads
 c. 3400 BC: Cosmetics, donkey domestication, (meteoric) iron works, mortar (masonry)
 c. 3300 BC: Double reed instruments and lyres (see Music of Egypt)
 c. 3100 BC: Pharaoh Narmer, or Menes, or possibly Hor-Aha unified Upper and Lower Egypt

Relative chronology

See also
 5.9 kiloyear event
 Prehistoric North Africa

Notes

References

External links
 Information about Ancient Egyptian History'': from This Is Egypt | Information about Ancient Egyptian History
 Ancient Egyptian History - A comprehensive and concise educational website focusing on the basic and the advanced in all aspects of Ancient Egypt
 Faium.com homepage
 Before the Pyramids: The Origins of Egyptian Civilization - Oriental Institute

 
 
Egypt
Egypt